Coptotriche pulverea is a moth of the  family Tischeriidae. It was described by Walsingham in 1897. It is found on the Virgin Islands (St. Thomas) and in Belize.

The larvae feed on Terminalia amazonia. They mine the leaves of their host plant.

References

Moths described in 1897
Tischeriidae